Reverend Nehemiah Adams (February 19, 1806 – October 6, 1878) was an American clergyman and writer.

Biography
He was born in Salem, Massachusetts, in 1806 to Nehemiah Adams and Mehitabel Torrey Adams. He graduated from Harvard University in 1826, and from Andover Theological Seminary in 1829. That same year, he was ordained as co-pastor, with Abiel Holmes, of the First Congregational Church in Cambridge, Massachusetts. In 1832, he married Martha Hooper.

In 1834, he became pastor of Union Congregational Church in Boston, Massachusetts. He would remain in that position until his death in 1878. In 1850, he married again, to Sarah Brackett.

In 1854, he took a trip to the American South, and wrote a book entitled A South-Side View of Slavery (Boston, 1854). In the book, he lauded slavery as beneficial to the Negroes' religious character. This book was one of several polemic works he wrote. It caused a great sensation, and he received much hostile criticism.  The book was attacked by abolitionists for its perceived moderation; the abolitionist newspaper The Liberator called it "as vile a work as was ever written, in apology and defence of 'the sum of all villanies'".

In 1861, Adams wrote a successor volume, The Sable Cloud, a Southern tale with Northern Comments, to answer his attackers, and it was met with a similar response.

He also wrote The Cross in the Cell, Scriptural Argument for Endless Punishment, Broadcast, At Eventide, and a Life of John Eliot. He was a member of the American Tract Society and the American Board for Foreign Missions.

In 1869, in consequence of his failing health, his people procured an associate pastor and gave Adams a long leave of absence. He made a voyage round the world and described it in Under the Mizzenmast (1871).

Adams died in 1878, aged 72. He left nine children.

Notes

Attribution:

References

Further reading

 
 
 A South-Side View of Slavery

1806 births
1878 deaths
Writers from Boston
Writers from Salem, Massachusetts
American Congregationalists
Harvard University alumni
American proslavery activists
Andover Theological Seminary alumni
19th-century American clergy